Geeta Colony Bridge (also known as the Geeta Colony Flyover) is a bridge in the city of Delhi, India. It crosses the Yamuna river, connecting the Trans-Yamuna area in East Delhi with Ring Road near Shantivan.

Role 
The Geeta Colony Bridge provides access between east, north, northwest, and Central Delhi. It was built to reduce congestion on the 150-year-old Yamuna Bridge and ITO Bridge by providing alternate access between East Delhi and Old Delhi. It is centrally located and serves a heavily populated area, making it an important route for commuters.

Design 
Geeta Colony Bridge is a dual carriageway bridge that spans 560 meters divided into 14  40 meter segments. It has two roadways each 9 meters wide, and bicycle and pedestrian lanes on both sides and a central median verge. The total width of the bridge is 27.1 meters. An estimated 220,000 vehicles cross the bridge daily.

History 
On 29 December 2004, M/S Navayuga Engineering Co. Ltd. contracted to construct the bridge, at a cost of 99.765 crore INR. It was allotted a construction period of 36 months.

On 27 December 2019, in response to protests against the Citizenship Amendment Act, the bridge was barricaded, causing significant traffic delays.

See also
 List of longest bridges above water in India
 List of bridges in India
 List of bridges
 New Yamuna Bridge, Allahabad

Reference

Bridges in Delhi
Bridges over Yamuna River
Transport in Delhi